Benjamin Bond (30 August 1904 – March 1972) was an English professional footballer who played as an outside right for Birmingham, for whom he made 82 appearances in the First Division of the Football League. His career was ended prematurely by a knee injury which required several operations. Before joining Birmingham, he played non-league football for Coseley, Pensnett, Upper Gornal, Wellington Town and Bilston United.

References

1904 births
1972 deaths
Footballers from Wolverhampton
English footballers
Association football outside forwards
Telford United F.C. players
Bilston Town F.C. players
Birmingham City F.C. players
English Football League players